Alain Convard (born 16 January 1947) is a French archer. He competed in the men's individual event at the 1972 Summer Olympics.

References

1947 births
Living people
French male archers
Olympic archers of France
Archers at the 1972 Summer Olympics
Place of birth missing (living people)